Elisha Sanguya (born 1957) is an Inuit sculptor and printmaker. He is a part of the Igutaq Group of printmakers in Clyde River, Nunavut. 

His work is included in the collections of the Musée national des beaux-arts du Québec, the National Gallery of Canada and the Winnipeg Art Gallery.

References

Living people
1957 births
20th-century Canadian women artists
21st-century Canadian women artists
Canadian women sculptors
Canadian printmakers
Women printmakers
Artists from Nunavut